Johannes Willms (25 May 1948 – 11 July 2022) was a German historian and journalist.

Biography
Born in Würzburg, Willms spent his childhood in Karlsruhe where his father, was a judge on the Federal Court of Justice. In 1975, he earned his doctorate at Heidelberg under the instruction of Reinhart Koselleck.

Willms worked as a journalist for the Hessian radio station Hessischer Rundfunk and the television channel ZDF. He served as director of the magazine  from 1988 to 1992 and co-founded the television channel . From 1993 to 2000, he was literary director of the daily newspaper Süddeutsche Zeitung and lived in Paris as a correspondent.

Aside from journalism, Willms wrote several historical publications, primarily on the history of France.

Johannes Willms died in Munich on 11 July 2022 at the age of 74.

Publications
Die Politik der officiers royaux auf den Etats Généraux 1576–1614 (1975)
Bücherfreunde, Büchernarren – Entwurf zur Archäologie einer Leidenschaft (1978)
Nationalismus ohne Nation. Deutsche Geschichte von 1789 bis 1914 (1983)
Paris. Hauptstadt Europas 1789–1914 (1988)
Bismarck – Dämon der Deutschen. Anmerkungen zu einer Legende (1987)
Napoleon. Verbannung und Verklärung (2000)
Die deutsche Krankheit. Eine kurze Geschichte der Gegenwart (2001)
Gebrauchsanweisung für Frankreich (2005)
Napoleon. Eine Biographie (2005)
Balzac. Eine Biographie (2007)
St. Helena. Kleine Insel, großer Wahn (2007)
Napoléon III. Frankreichs letzter Kaiser (2008)
Frankreich (2009)
Stendhal. Biographie (2010)
Talleyrand. Virtuose der Macht 1754–1838 (2011)
Tugend und Terror. Geschichte der Französischen Revolution (2014)
Waterloo. Napoleons letzte Schlacht (2015)
Mirabeau oder Die Morgenröte der Revolution (2017)
Der General Charles de Gaulle und sein Jahrhundert. Biographie (2019)
Der Mythos Napoleon. Verheißung – Verbannung – Verklärung (2020)

References

1948 births
2022 deaths
German historians
German journalists
People from Würzburg
University of Vienna alumni
University of Seville alumni
Heidelberg University alumni